Havistin (also Romanized as Hāvīstīn; also known as Havestīn and Havīstūn) is a village in Harzandat-e Sharqi Rural District, in the Central District of Marand County, East Azerbaijan Province, Iran. At the 2006 census, its population was 330, in 90 families.

References 

Populated places in Marand County